Conor Fitzgerald (born 1981 in Adare, County Limerick, Ireland) is an Irish sportsperson.  He plays hurling with his local club Adare and was a member of the Limerick senior inter-county team from 2003 until 2006.

References

1981 births
Living people
Adare hurlers
Limerick inter-county hurlers